Bathysciadiidae is a family of sea snails, deep-sea limpets, marine gastropod mollusks in the clade Cocculiniformia (according to the taxonomy of the Gastropoda by Bouchet & Rocroi, 2005). 

This family has no subfamilies.

Genera 
Genera within the family Bathysciadiidae include:
 Bathyaltum Haszprunar, 2011
 Bathypelta Moskalev, 1971
 Bathysciadium Dautzenberg & Fischer, 1900 - type genus of the family Bathysciadiidae
 Bonus Moskalev, 1973
 Bonus petrochenckoi Moskalev, 1973
 Pilus Warén, 1991
 Xenodonta Warén, 1993

References

 Hartmann H., Hess M. & Haszprunar G. (2011) Interactive 3D anatomy and affinities of Bathysciadiidae (Gastropoda, Cocculinoidea): Deep-sea limpets feeding on decaying cephalopod beaks. Journal of Morphology 272: 259-279

External links

 
Gastropod families